2013 in professional wrestling describes the year's events in the world of professional wrestling.

List of notable promotions 
These promotions held notable shows in 2013.

Calendar of notable shows

January

February

March

April

May

June

July

August

September

October

November

December

Accomplishments and tournaments

AAA

Ring of Honor

Total Nonstop Action Wrestling

WWE

Title changes

AAA

NJPW

ROH

The Crash Lucha Libre

TNA

WWE

NXT

Awards and honors

AAA Hall of Fame

Pro Wrestling Illustrated

TNA Hall of Fame

Wrestling Observer Newsletter

Wrestling Observer Newsletter Hall of Fame

Wrestling Observer Newsletter awards

WWE

WWE Hall of Fame

Slammy Awards

Debuts

 January 8 – Dan Moloney
 January 20 – Aliyah
 February 19 – Jay White
 March 24 – The Rotation
 March 29 – Renee Young
 May 17 – No Way Jose
 May 25 
 Akane Fujita
 Big Boss Shimizu
 May 29 – Mojo Rawley
 June 20 – Alexa Bliss
 June 26 – JoJo
 July 1 – Eva Marie
 August 18 
 Saki Akai
 Yako Fujigasaki
 September – Carmella
 October 23 – Lana
 November 4 
 Koguma
 Rina Yamashita
 December 6 – Deonna Purrazzo
 December 15 – Takayuki Ueki

Retirements 

 Butch Reed (1978-2013)
 Diane Von Hoffman (1981–2013)
 Viscera (1991–2013)
 Eve Torres (October 29, 2007 – January 14, 2013)
 Robbie Ellis (1966-March 22, 2013) 
 Jerry Lynn (March 23, 1988 – March 23, 2013)
 Frank Durso (1961-March 23, 2013) 
 Big Bully Busick (1977-April 19, 2013) 
 Kenta Kobashi (February 26, 1988 – May 11, 2013)
 Epiphany (October 2008 – July 4, 2013)
 Ayumi Kurihara (April 24, 2005 – August 4, 2013)
 Ted DiBiase Jr. (2006 – September 1, 2013)
 Yoshihito Sasaki (September 7, 2000 – September 25, 2013)
 Ivan Koloff (1961-November 16, 2013) 
 William Regal (1983-November 21, 2013)  
 Manny Fernandez (1977-November 30, 2013) (returned to wrestling in 2017) 
 Roxxi Laveaux (2002 - December 6, 2013)

Deaths

January 11 - Billy Varga, 94
February 20 - Cyclone Negro, 80
 March 5 – Paul Bearer, 58.
 March 21 – Moondog Spike, 62.
 March 21 – Reid Flair, 25.
 April 18 - Jerry Balisok, 57
 May 22 – Mick McManus, 93.
 May 26 – Héctor Garza, 43.
 May 28 - Buck Robley, 68
 June 7 – Mark Starr, 50.
 June 14 – Al Green, 57. 
 June 24 – Jackie Fargo, 82.
 June 28 – Matt Borne, 55.
 July 19 - Geeto Mongol, 82
 July 31 - Corey Maclin, 43
 August 3 – Dutch Savage, 78.
 August 14 - Gia Allemand, 29 
 September 20 – Angelo Savoldi, 99.
 September 29 – Gene Petit, c.64.
 October 15 – El Brazo, 52.
 October 21 - Randhawa (wrestler), 79/80 
 November 4 - Gashouse Gilbert, 76
 November 21 – Mad Dog Vachon, 84.
 December 1 – Garry Robbins, 56
 December 18 - Onno Boelee, 68
 December 19 - Pedro Septién, 97
 December 29 – Ari Romero, 62.

See also
List of NJPW pay-per-view events
List of ROH pay-per-view events
List of TNA pay-per-view events
List of WWE pay-per-view events

References

 
professional wrestling